Klara Bodinson (born 11 June 1990) is a Swedish runner who competes primarily in the 3000 metres steeplechase. She represented her country at the 2015 World Championships in Athletics in Beijing without qualifying for the final. Her personal best in the event is 9:40.21 set in Ninove in 2015.

Competition record

References

External links

1990 births
Living people
Swedish female middle-distance runners
Swedish female steeplechase runners
World Athletics Championships athletes for Sweden
Place of birth missing (living people)
Athletes (track and field) at the 2016 Summer Olympics
Olympic athletes of Sweden
21st-century Swedish women